RSK may stand for:

 RSK Group, a UK consultancy group
 Republic of Serbian Krajina
 Robinson–Schensted–Knuth correspondence in mathematics
 Ribosomal s6 kinase, protein kinasesr
 RSK Sanyo Broadcasting, Japan
 Red Skin Kingz, Native American gang
 , the ISO language code for Pannonian Rusyn